Jabuka (Foča) is a village in the municipality of Foča-Ustikolina, Bosnia and Herzegovina.

The word jabuka means apple in Bosnian.

Demographics 
According to the 2013 census, its population was 88, all Bosniaks.

References

Populated places in Foča-Ustikolina